Her Dormant Love is a 1915 American drama film featuring Harry Carey.

Cast
 Harry Carey
 Claire McDowell
 Charles West (as Charles H. West)

See also
 Harry Carey filmography

External links

1915 films
1915 short films
American silent short films
American black-and-white films
1915 drama films
Silent American drama films
1910s American films